This is a list of seasons played by Hapoel Tel Aviv Football Club in Israeli and European football, from 1927 (when the club first started to form) to the most recent completed season. It details the club's achievements in major competitions, and the top scorers for each season. Top scorers in bold were also the top scorers in the Israeli league that season. Records of minor competitions such as the Lilian Cup are not included due to them being considered of less importance than the State Cup and the Toto Cup.

The club has won the League championship thirteen times, the State Cup fourteen times and the Toto Cup once. The club has never been out of the top two divisions of Israeli football.

History
Hapoel Tel Aviv Football Club was established in 1927 in the port city of Tel Aviv. In 1928 the club won the State Cup, the first Jewish football club to win the title.  In 1934 the club won the league championship, becoming the first Jewish club to win the championship. The club represented Israel in the Asian Champion Club Tournament in 1967, winning the title, and in 1970, when the club lost in the final. As Israel joined UEFA, in 1992, the club participated in UEFA tournaments, reaching the Champions League group stage in 2010–11 and the quarter-finals in the 2001–02 UEFA Cup.

Seasons

Key

 P = Played
 W = Games won
 D = Games drawn
 L = Games lost
 F = Goals for
 A = Goals against
 Pts = Points
 Pos = Final position

 Leumit = Liga Leumit (National League)
 Artzit = Liga Artzit (Nationwide League)
 Premier = Liga Al (Premier League)
 Pal. League = Palestine League

 F = Final
 Group = Group stage
 QF = Quarter-finals
 QR1 = First Qualifying Round
 QR2 = Second Qualifying Round
 QR3 = Third Qualifying Round
 QR4 = Fourth Qualifying Round
 RInt = Intermediate Round

 R1 = Round 1
 R2 = Round 2
 R3 = Round 3
 R4 = Round 4
 R5 = Round 5
 R6 = Round 6
 SF = Semi-finals

Notes

References

Hapoel Tel Aviv F.C.
 
Hapoel Tel Aviv
Hapoel